"Death To Perfection" is the debut album by Torch. The album was released on March 27, 2006, and was recorded at Dsign Studio in Trondheim. It was produced and engineered by the band themselves and Edgar Lien.

Track listing
All tracks by Torch

"K-Bomb" – 3:36
"I'm All About Something New" – 2:36
"Endeavour" – 2:58
"The Experiment" – 3:26
"Everything Consists (Of What You Might Believe)" – 3:52
"Previously Cured" – 6:19
"A.I.H.O.H." – 3:46
"So We've Come To This" – 4:21
"A Few Moments Of Clarity" – 5:18
"Mary" – 5:09

Personnel 

Marius Forbord - Vocals
Jørgen Berg - Guitar
Torbjørn Ringstad - Guitar
Tommy Kviseth - Bass
Thomas Farstad - Drums

Additional personnel

Jan Arild Johansen - piano on Track 6 (interlude)
Gunnhild Sundli (Gåte) - guest vocals on "Everything Consists (Of What You Might Believe)"

Torch (band) albums
2006 albums